Kartabad (also Romanized as Kartābād and Kertābād) is a village in Hemmatabad Rural District, in the Central District of Borujerd County, Lorestan Province, Iran. At the 2006 census, its population was 140, in 34 families.

References 

Towns and villages in Borujerd County